Mahn Johnny is a Burmese politician, political prisoner and the former Chief Minister for Ayeyarwady Region. He is currently serving as a member of the Ayeyarwady Region Hluttaw for Kyonpyaw Township Constituency No. 2.

Early life and education 
Johnny matriculated from high school in 1960 and studied at the Bassein Regional College. From 1965 to 1986, he worked as a primary and secondary school teacher. In 1980, he received a diploma in education from the Rangoon Institute of Education. Johnny is an ethnic Karen and a Catholic.

Political career 
In the 1990 Burmese general election, he was elected as an Pyithu Hluttaw MP, winning a majority of 31,731 votes (73% of the votes), but was never allowed to assume his seat.

In the 2012 Myanmar by-elections, he won a seat in the Pyithu Hluttaw, representing Myaungmya Township.

In the 2015 Myanmar general election, Johnny won a seat in the Ayeyarwady Region Hluttaw, representing Kyonpyaw Township.

Johnny resigned from his position as Chief Minister of Ayeyarwaddy Region on 9 January 2018, citing health reasons. He was succeeded by Hla Moe Aung.

2021 Anti-Coup Resistance

In late August, photos of Mahn Johny wearing army fatigues and a large loaded rifle were published and spread on Facebook. The military junta was raided the following day, allegedly seizing property. In an interview with Myanmar Now, Johnny stated that he would continue fighting against the injustice of the coup. Johnny's house would later be sealed and his sons and daughters-in-law ordered to leave the premises.

References

Members of Pyithu Hluttaw
National League for Democracy politicians
Prisoners and detainees of Myanmar
1942 births
Living people
People from Ayeyarwady Region
Burmese people of Karen descent
Burmese Roman Catholics